The 1966 Coupe de France Final was a football match held at Stade Olympique Yves-du-Manoir, Colombes on 22 May 1966 that saw RC Strasbourg defeat FC Nantes 1–0 thanks to a goal by Pierre Sbaiz.

Context

This game featured and opposition of style and was another round in the wild discussion in France at the time between the adepts of zone-marking and individual marking. Champions FC Nantes, led by manager José Arribas, practiced the famous "jeu à la nantaise" with a strong emphasis on short passes, technical virtuosity and the zone defense. Strasbourg's strong points, to the contrary, were more in the physical abilities developed under Paul Frantz's guidance and counter-attack, relying on the speed of young wingers Gilbert Gress and Gérard Hausser. In addition, the Alsatian team used the catenaccio defense with Denis Devaux as sweeper.

Strasbourg managed to annihilate Nantes' offensive power and had its task facilitated when Argentinean Ramon Muller was forced to leave the game after 30 minutes due to injury (substitutions were not authorized at that time). In the early second half, Pierre Sbaiz was able to score from 20 meters after a José Farías free-kick. Strasbourg held on to the score and won its second cup, the second also for captain René Hauss who accomplished the remarkable feat of winning two cups under the same jersey with a 15-year interval.

TV reporter Thierry Roland commented that "the Cup was leaving France", an assertion that was deemed offensive by many in Alsace. During the 1990s, Roland was still booed in Strasbourg due to this outrageous comment.

Match details

See also
1965–66 Coupe de France

References

External links
Coupe de France results at Rec.Sport.Soccer Statistics Foundation
Report on French federation site
Video at INA

Coupe De France Final
1966
Coupe De France Final 1966
Coupe De France Final 1966
Coupe de France Final
Coupe de France Final